Martin Andre Breytenbach was a South African Anglican bishop. He was the bishop of the Diocese of St Mark the Evangelist, a diocese of the Anglican Church of Southern Africa (ACSA) from 2000 to 2019.

Education 
He trained and worked as a civil engineer before entering the priesthood. He was consecrated bishop of the Diocese of St Mark the Evangelist in a service held on 5 February 2000, at St. Mary's Cathedral, in Johannesburg, by the Archbishop of Canterbury, George Carey. Since becoming bishop, Breytenbach has been Liaison Bishop for the Anglican Students’ Federation, as well as for Anglican Renewal Ministries (now Anglicans Ablaze) and SOMA (Sharing of Ministries Abroad).

He is a member of the ACSA Liturgical Committee. He serves as chairman of ACSA's new initiative, Growing the Church.

He retired after 19 years in the Diocese of St Mark the Evangelist in February 2019.

Notes and references

Sources

External links 

 In my view

Living people
Anglican bishops of St Mark the Evangelist
Year of birth missing (living people)